Colored Sands is the fifth full-length album by technical death metal band Gorguts. It is Gorguts' first studio album since 2001's From Wisdom to Hate. The album features the band's first recordings with guitarist Kevin Hufnagel and bassist Colin Marston, and the band's only recordings with drummer John Longstreth. It is a concept album based on Tibet. The album was released digitally on August 6, 2013, and the release of the CD and vinyl versions on September 3, 2013.

Background
Luc Lemay joined Negativa with Steeve Hurdle after Gorguts disbanded in 2005, but felt uncomfortable with the improvisational elements in that band's music. At Hurdle's recommendation, Lemay reformed Gorguts in summer 2008 in order to prepare for the twentieth anniversary of Gorguts' 1989 formation.  As Lemay recollected, "When Steeve brought the idea to me to make a new record to celebrate the 20th anniversary of the band, I'd never thought about it before. I was very happy with everything the band had accomplished in the past and I had no intention of making a new record. Then, when I started to write, I had no apprehensions either...I just went with the flow and wrote the music I wanted to hear".

Lemay pursued drummer John Longstreth after being impressed with his performance on Dim Mak's album Knives of Ice. Longstreth and Lemay began rehearsing in early 2009. Lemay had previously met Colin Marston at a Negativa show in Montreal and originally wanted him to play guitar in the reformed Gorguts; however, Hurdle recommended Kevin Hufnagel as a potential guitarist, and Lemay agreed that his playing was impressive. Marston and Hufnagel both agreed to join the group, with Marston on bass instead of guitar.  Lemay has confirmed that his collaboration with Marston and Hufnagel - who are also classically trained musicians - were critical to the composition of Colored Sands:

Musical style and concept
Lemay placed Colored Sands in the context of Gorguts previous work by explaining that, beginning with Obscura, the band "deliberately made an effort to not do such things as the fast Slayer beats, no more fast picking riffs and other ideas found on our second album The Erosion of Sanity".  This prompted the band to develop what Lemay described as "a new musical language" that was first heard on Obscura. However, Lemay noted that Obscura was essentially a "first draft of this new language", for which "the outcome is somewhat simplistic".  Lemay viewed From Wisdom to Hate and Colored Sands as more sophisticated expressions of the "musical language" developed by Gorguts.

The songs on Colored Sands were written by Lemay (with the exception of "Forgotten Arrows", written by Marston, and "Absconders", written by Hufnagel), but the other band members composed most of their own parts. Inspired by Opeth and the album The Incident by Porcupine Tree, Lemay intended to write more progressive songs with longer running times and more dynamics.  Lemay described the album as having more of a "soundtrack approach" that, while containing the essential ingredients of Obscura and From Wisdom to Hate, differed in how it was composed and arranged.  As he explained, "I think we took more time to say things musically on this record; not that we were in a rush on the other records, but the songs were shorter....With this one, it breathes more".

The album's concept was inspired by Lemay's viewing of a child's drawing of a Tibetan sand mandala, which is a symbol made of colored sand that is ritualistically destroyed once it has been constructed.  Lemay confirmed that the album's title alludes to sand mandalas. Lemay explained that, while he initially considered writing an album entirely based upon the sand mandala, he later expanded to focus upon Tibetan culture, geography, and history.  Lemay explained that it was intent to "create a storytelling mood within the music; sort of like motion picture music". Lemay referred to Tibet as "the canvas for the music" in which the first four songs discuss "the splendours of the country, the culture, the topography, the geography", and the last four refer to "the country being invaded, people protesting through immolation, people getting killed trying to escape"; the song "Absconders" is based on Jonathan Green's book Murder in the High Himalaya about the Nangpa La shooting incident, and quotes the book with Green's permission.

The transition between the first four songs and the last four is an orchestral piece, "The Battle of Chamdo", which refers to the invasion of Tibet by China. The piece was written by Lemay on piano and recorded with a string quintet.  Compared to classical composers Shostakovitch and Penderecki (which has been acknowledged and affirmed by Lemay), the song represents a critical turning point in the album concept, according to Lemay: "The topic of this song, the Chinese invasion of 1950, is the most important thing that happened to this country [Tibet]...so the instrumentation is different - it's striking".  He further explained how "The Battle of Chamdo" served as the watershed of Colored Sands:

The album concept ultimately concludes, on "Reduced to Silence", with Lemay's consideration of non-violence as it relates to Tibetan history and the preservation of a threatened culture:

Lemay later said that he did not understand human nature as it related to the tragedies inflicted upon the Tibetan people.  "I don’t understand why any man on earth would have the tiniest bit of anger toward the Tibetan people. They've been pacific people for centuries; owning an army did not seem to be a priority in their values since they're not interested in the concepts of jealousy, domination, [or] megalomania".  However, he wondered, "did their non-violent philosophy serve and help their cause? I don't think so..." The lack of intervention by the world powers was also criticized by Lemay: "The whole world knows Tibet and Tibetan culture is very non-threatening, but nobody puts a real foot down to help them and get the Chinese out of there. The title comes from how I was seeing the ground coloured by suffering".

Artwork
The album cover and interior artwork features paintings by Martin Lacroix. The paintings were completed in close collaboration with Luc Lemay. While Lemay affirmed that he had a "very clear vision" for how each illustration would tell a story, he admitted surprise at how Lacroix's creative choices for the cover ultimately embodied his vision:

Lemay noted that Tibetan scriptures written alongside the titles in the booklet are, in fact, direct translations of the titles that were provided by a Montreal resident.

Release
A rough instrumental demo of "Enemies of Compassion" was previewed on the band's Myspace page in 2011. Prior to the album's release, the songs "Forgotten Arrows" and "An Ocean of Wisdom" were made available for online streaming.  As a response to the album leaking onto file sharing sites in July 2013, Season of Mist released a digital version of the album on August 6, nearly a month ahead of the scheduled release date. The CD and vinyl versions were released on September 3, 2013.

Critical reception

According to Metacritic, Colored Sands has received "universal acclaim". Decibel Magazine's Chris Dick proclaimed Colored Sands a leap beyond "mere tech-death metal" that is "new, fresh and expectedly challenging".  Writing for Pitchfork, Hank Shteamer enthused over the album's "breathtaking detail and scope" which imbued the album with a "vast dynamic range. On one hand, it contains some of the thorniest, most aggressive death metal ever issued under the Gorguts name; on the other, it includes moments of stunning textural beauty".  Sputnikmusic's Sobhi Youssef viewed the album as a continuation of the experimentation heard on From Wisdom to Hate, noting that Colored Sands "brings even more ideas to the table" without departing from the band's "trademark dissonance-come-insanity", which "is fused in the very fabric of each section, lending a dose of controlled chaos to the near classical designs and atmospheric build-up of Colored Sands". Denise Falzon, writing for Exclaim!, awarded the album a perfect score and praised the "impeccable" musicianship directed towards elaborating "the more progressive and experimental side of the group".  Sammy O'Hagar of MetalSucks also praised Gorguts for maintaining its distinctive core while presenting an album that sounds "very different" from the rest of its discography.  However, the album did draw qualified criticism, with Ben Ratliffe of The New York Times opining that, unlike Obscura'''s sense of "nearly constant surprise", Colored Sands'' is "frustratingly consistent in its overall dark, dense, misty color and atmosphere... It goes all over the place according to the dictates of Gorguts’ own style, but remains rooted to the spot".

The album is a longlisted nominee for the 2014 Polaris Music Prize.

Track listing
All songs written by Luc Lemay, except "Forgotten Arrows" by Colin Marston and "Absconders" by Kevin Hufnagel. Arrangements by Gorguts.  All lyrics by Luc Lemay.

Credits

Personnel
 Luc Lemay – vocals, guitar
 Kevin Hufnagel – guitar
 Colin Marston – bass guitar
 John Longstreth – drums

Additional personnel
 Joshua Modney - violin on "The Battle of Chamdo"
 Emily Holden - violin on "The Battle of Chamdo"
 Victor Lowre - viola on "The Battle of Chamdo"
 Isabel Castellvi - cello on "The Battle of Chamdo"
 Gregory Chudzik - bass on "The Battle of Chamdo"

Production
 Pierre Remillard - engineering, production
 Martin Brunet - engineering, production
 Colin Marston - production, mixing, mastering, and additional recording of string orchestra, vocals, additional guitar and drums
 Martin Lacroix - cover and layout illustrations
 Luc Lemay - production

References

2013 albums
Gorguts albums
Season of Mist albums
Concept albums
Albums produced by Colin Marston